Tune in Tomorrow is a 1990 American comedy film directed by Jon Amiel. It is based on the 1977 Mario Vargas Llosa novel Aunt Julia and the Scriptwriter, and was released under that same title in many countries. Relocated from the novel's setting in 1950s-era Lima, Peru to New Orleans, Louisiana that same decade, it stars Peter Falk, Keanu Reeves and Barbara Hershey in a story surrounding a radio drama. The soundtrack for the film was composed by Wynton Marsalis, who makes a cameo appearance with various members of his band.

Plot
Martin Loader works at WXBU, the local radio station, where scriptwriter Pedro Carmichael is hired. Pedro, who is known to come up with outrageous storylines that involve people in his real life, becomes a mentor figure to the younger Martin. Martin's Aunt Julia, not related by blood, returns to New Orleans after many years away and Martin falls for her. Once Pedro learns about their romance, he starts incorporating details of it into the script of his daily drama series, called "Kings of the Garden District". Soon, Martin and Julia are not only hearing about their fictional selves over the radio, but they hear about what they are going to do next.

Cast

Production
Principal photography began in Wilmington, North Carolina, on August 15, 1989. Hurricane Hugo damaged the film sets, so the production moved to New Orleans. Filming was wrapped by November 2. 

The soap opera characters in the radio drama are voiced by the fictional WXBU employees. For instance, the fictional character "Richard Quince" is voiced by Leonard Pando, but is seen by the audience as Peter Gallagher.

Reception
On Rotten Tomatoes the film has an approval rating of 50% based on 12 reviews.

Roger Ebert gave the movie 2 and a half stars out of 4, noting that "sometimes we laugh easily, sometimes uncertainly, and sometimes we just look at the screen and wonder why anyone thought that was funny." He added that though "some of the movie's best laughs come when the jaws of the listeners drop open with shock and amazement at some of Falk's more outrageous fantasies", the film's uneven comic tone remains a problem throughout the story.

Desson Thomson of The Washington Post wrote, "The movie spends too much time with the Aunt and not enough with the Scriptwriter."
Rita Kempley, also of The Washington Post, was more positive about the film: "A tri-layered tale of love, creative impulses and dial-spinning, it comes and it goes, evocative and a little bit magical, flawed but forgivably so."

References

External links
 
 
 Tune in Tomorrow at Amazon

1990 films
1990 comedy films
American comedy films
Films shot in New Orleans
Films set in New Orleans
Films shot in North Carolina
Films about radio people
Radio drama
Films set in 1951
Films directed by Jon Amiel
1990s American films
Films with screenplays by William Boyd (writer)
Films based on works by Mario Vargas Llosa
1990s English-language films